Voltaic Communist Organization (OCV) was a communist party in the country now known as Burkina Faso. It was founded in 1971 out of the student milieu. In 1978 OCV split in two, the pro-China Communist Struggle Union (ULC) and the pro-Albanian Voltaic Revolutionary Communist Party (PCRV).

Communist parties in Burkina Faso
Defunct political parties in Burkina Faso
Political parties established in 1971
Political parties disestablished in 1978
Defunct Maoist parties
Maoism in Africa